The Cedars is a historic hotel building located at Hendersonville, Henderson County, North Carolina. It was built in 1914, and is a 3 1/2-story, Classical Revival style brick veneer building.  The front facade features a monumental tetrastyle Ionic order portico. It operated as a hotel until 1976.

It was listed on the National Register of Historic Places in 1989.

References

Hotel buildings on the National Register of Historic Places in North Carolina
Neoclassical architecture in North Carolina
Hotel buildings completed in 1914
Buildings and structures in Henderson County, North Carolina
National Register of Historic Places in Henderson County, North Carolina
Hendersonville, North Carolina